Darlaston Town (1874) Football Club is an English association football club that represents the town of Darlaston, West Midlands but is currently based in Walsall.

History
The club was formed in 1874.

In 2014, the club was accepted into the West Midlands (Regional) League Division Two, two leagues below where the original club left off. In just their second season in the league, the club finished 3rd and level on points behind runners-up FC Stafford.

On 10 October 2015, the club attracted their highest league home gate when 105 spectators took in the visit of local neighbours Wednesfield.

The 2018–19 season saw the club go 20 league games unbeaten.  In June 2019, the club were granted a place in the Premier Division for the first time in 6 years alongside 17 other clubs. Their first season back, however, was cut short when the majority of the English non-league pyramid seasons were abandoned due to the COVID-19 pandemic.  At the end of the 2020–21 season the club were transferred to Division One of the Midland League when the Premier Division of the West Midlands (Regional) League lost its status as a step six division.

Ground
The club currently play their home games at the Bentley Sports Pavilion in Walsall. The ground is currently known as The Paycare Ground for sponsorship reasons.

References

External links
Official website

Football clubs in England
Football clubs in the West Midlands (county)
2014 establishments in England
Association football clubs established in 2014
Sport in the West Midlands (county)
West Midlands (Regional) League
Midland Football League